Andrew Jones was the member of Parliament for Cricklade in 1386.

References 

Year of birth missing
English MPs 1386
Members of Parliament for Cricklade
Year of death missing